The 1998 MTV Europe Music Awards took place in Assago, near Milan, Italy. The ceremony was hosted by former Playboy model, actress and comedian Jenny McCarthy.

On this year 6 new categories were introduced including the MTV Selects; UK and Ireland, Northern, Central and Southern.
The big winner of the night were the Spice Girls and Madonna with two awards. Melanie C, alias Sporty Spice, and Emma Bunton, known as Baby Spice, collected the trophy on behalf of the group. On receiving the award, Mel C shouted: "We've done it again". "And a big hello from the other two", she added, referring to Mel B and Victoria Adams, both of whom were pregnant and did not attend the ceremony.

Nominations
Winners are in bold text.

Regional nominations
Winners are in bold text.

Performances
Faithless (featuring Sally Bradshaw) — "God is a DJ"
Madonna — "The Power of Good-Bye"
Busta Rhymes — "Turn It Up / Gimme Some More"
Manic Street Preachers — "If You Tolerate This Your Children Will Be Next"
Aqua — "Turn Back Time / Barbie Girl / Lollipop (Candyman) / Doctor Jones"
Pras (featuring Destiny's Child and The Product G&B) — "Blue Angels / Ghetto Supastar (That Is What You Are)"
Five — "Everybody Get Up"
Rammstein — "Du Hast"
All Saints — "Lady Marmalade"
R.E.M. — "Daysleeper"
Robbie Williams — "Millennium / Let Me Entertain You"

Appearances
George Michael — presented Best Male
Donatella Versace and Alessandro Del Piero — presented Best Group
Fun Lovin' Criminals — presented Best Rock
Ronan Keating and Dolce & Gabbana — presented Best Female
B*Witched and Ulf Ekberg — presented MTV Select—Northern
Eagle-Eye Cherry and Busta Rhymes — presented Best Pop
Nek and Saffron — presented MTV Select—Central
Zucchero and Renzo Rosso — presented MTV Select—Southern
R.E.M. — presented the Free Your Mind award
Jean Paul Gaultier and Giorgio Armani — presented Breakthrough Artist
RZA and Ultra Naté — presented Best Rap
Natalie Imbruglia and Gavin Rossdale — presented Best Dance
Cleopatra — presented MTV Select—UK & Ireland
Skunk Anansie (Skin and Mark Richardson) and The Cranberries (Dolores O'Riordan and Fergal Lawler) — presented Best Song
Sarah, Duchess of York — presented Best Video
Damon Albarn and Ronaldo — presented Best Album

See also
1998 MTV Video Music Awards

References

External links
Nominees

1998
1998 music awards
1998 in Italian music
November 1998 events in Europe